A list of films produced in Argentina in 1938:

1938
Films
Argentine